The 1995 SEC Championship Game was won by the Florida Gators 34–3 over the Arkansas Razorbacks. The game was played in the Georgia Dome in Atlanta, Georgia, on December 2, 1995, and was televised to a national audience on ABC.

References

External links
Recap of the game from SECsports.com

Championship Game
SEC Championship Game
Arkansas Razorbacks football games
Florida Gators football games
December 1995 sports events in the United States
1995 in sports in Georgia (U.S. state)
1995 in Atlanta